Deepwater Bay is a saltwater bay of the Salish Sea on the southeast side of Cypress Island in the U.S. state of Washington. It was the site of an unintentional release of aquaculture-raised Atlantic salmon in 2017, the Cypress Island Atlantic salmon pen break, initially blamed on the Solar eclipse of August 21, 2017.

References

 

Bays of Washington (state)